Nand Lal Chaudhary  ( – 14 January 2020) was an Indian politician from Bihar belonging to Indian National Congress. He was elected twice as a legislator of the Bihar Legislative Assembly. He also served as the president of East Champaran unit of Indian National Congress from 1995 to 2005.

Biography
Chaudhary was elected as a legislator of the Bihar Legislative Assembly from Pipra, Purvi Champaran in 1980. He was also elected from this constituency in 1985. He served as the president of East Champaran unit of Indian National Congress from 1995 to 2005.

Chaudhary died on 14 January 2020 at the age of 84.

References

1930s births
2020 deaths
Indian National Congress politicians from Bihar
Members of the Bihar Legislative Assembly
People from East Champaran district